William "Bill" Kimbel (April 15, 1954 – April 17, 2022) was a renowned paleoanthropologist specializing in Plio-Pleistocene hominid evolution in Africa. He had a multi-decade career at Arizona State University, first as a professor in the Anthropology Department and then as the Director of the Institute of Human Origins and Virginia M. Ullman Professor of Natural History and the Environment in the School of Human Evolution and Social Change.

Career 
Kimbel obtained his PhD from Kent State University, and served as Associate Curator and Head of Physical Anthropology at the Cleveland Museum of Natural History from 1981-1985. In 1985, he began work for the Institute of Human Origins in Berkeley, California, under the leadership of prominent physical anthropologist Donald Johanson, and later had a long career at Arizona State University. There, following Johanson's retirement, he became Director of the relocated Institute of Human Origins and served as Virginia M. Ullman Professor of Natural History and the Environment in the School of Human Evolution and Social Change. He was an editor at the Journal of Human Evolution from 2003-2008.

Kimbel was well-known for leading paleoanthropological fieldwork, including at the Hadar hominin site in the Afar Region, Ethiopia, from which he described many important fossil discoveries. These included one of the earliest specimens of the genus Homo. He often encouraged students and early career researchers to join him in the field, and used his experience in the Afar to offer a hands-on educational experience at the Hadar Field School. He also worked on other famous paleoanthropological sites including Olduvai Gorge, Tanzania, and Amud Cave, Israel.

Expertise 
Kimbel's expertise centered on hominin evolution in Africa during the Pliocene and Pleistocene. He published widely on topics including Australopithecus skull morphology and biological systematics.

References

External links 
Video from CARTA, recorded in 2016 - William Kimbel: Australopithecus and the Emergence of Earliest Homo

1954 births
2022 deaths
American paleontologists
Kent State University alumni
Writers from Philadelphia